Nicholas James Dougherty (born 24 May 1982) is a retired English professional golfer.

Dougherty was born in Bootle, Merseyside, and attended Queen Elizabeth's Grammar School in Blackburn, Lancashire. He is a protégé of former professional golfer, Nick Faldo, and had an exceptional amateur career. He won numerous tournaments including the 1999 World Boys Championship and three Faldo Junior Series events. In 2001 he was a member of the victorious Great Britain and Ireland Walker Cup team.

Professional playing career
Dougherty turned professional in 2001 and gained membership to the European Tour for 2002 via the final qualifying school. In his début season he finished 36th on the Order of Merit, and was named the Sir Henry Cotton Rookie of the Year. He was hindered by glandular fever in 2003, and his 2004 season was also disappointing when he slipped to 97th on the Order of Merit. In early 2005 he earned his first victory on the European Tour at the Caltex Masters in Singapore, going on to reach the top 100 of the Official World Golf Rankings in the middle of the year, and ended it in 15th place on the final European Tour Order of Merit. He also made a strong start to the 2006 season before struggling later in the year.

Dougherty would bounce back in 2007, and was the leader after the first round of the 107th US Open at Oakmont Country Club with a two under par round of 68. He eventually finished the tournament in a tie for seventh place. This is, to date, his best finish in a major championship, and was also enough to gain automatic entry into the following years championship and the US Masters. Later that year he secured his second European Tour victory at the Alfred Dunhill Links Championship, and finished the season placed 11th on the Order of Merit.

After a disappointing 2008 season which was marred by the sudden death of his mother, Dougherty recorded his third European Tour victory at the 2009 BMW International Open in Munich, Germany. He was three shots behind 54-hole leader Retief Goosen going into the final round. He shot a final round of 64 and ended with a one stroke victory over Rafael Echenique, who made an albatross 2 on the par-5 18th, and by four over Goosen.
The win secured Dougherty a spot in his first major of 2009, The Open Championship at Turnberry in July.

Dougherty ended up losing his European Tour card in 2011 after making only one cut during 32 events. Although he finished 45th at the Omega European Masters with a first day 63 helping him to prize money of 10,600 euros, it was not enough to retain his 2012 tour card. He attended the European Qualifying School in late 2011, but was unsuccessful and consequently settled for membership on the Challenge Tour. At the end of 2013 he found himself at Q school on the Challenge Tour where he stated he was much happier with his game than he had been for a while, but success continued to elude him. Dougherty has not played a European Tour-sanctioned event since 2016.

Broadcasting
After his retirement from playing Dougherty moved into the media with a position at Sky Sports Golf as a presenter.

Amateur wins
1997 Faldo Junior Series, Golf Foundation Player of the Year
1999 Faldo Junior Series, European Under 21 Championship, World Boys Championship, Polo Classic Under 19 Championship (United States)
2000 Faldo Junior Series, Polo Golf Classic Stroke Play Championship (United States), Guatemalan Amateur Open Championship
2001 Lake Macquarie Amateur

Professional wins (3)

European Tour wins (3)

1Co-sanctioned by the Asian Tour

Results in major championships

CUT = missed the half-way cut
"T" = tied

Summary

Most consecutive cuts made – 2 (2007 U.S. Open – 2007 Open Championship)
Longest streak of top-10s – 1

Results in World Golf Championships

QF, R16, R32, R64 = Round in which player lost in match play
"T" = Tied
Note that the HSBC Champions did not become a WGC event until 2009.

Team appearances
Amateur
European Boys' Team Championship (representing England): 1998, 1999 (winners), 2000
European Amateur Team Championship (representing England): 2001
Walker Cup (representing Great Britain & Ireland): 2001 (winners)
St Andrews Trophy (representing Great Britain & Ireland): 2000 (winners)
Jacques Léglise Trophy (representing Great Britain & Ireland): 1998 (winners), 1999 (winners)
World Boys: 1998 (winners), 1999 (winners)

Professional
Seve Trophy (representing Great Britain & Ireland): 2005 (winners), 2007 (winners), 2009 (winners)
Royal Trophy (representing Europe): 2009

References

External links

English male golfers
European Tour golfers
People educated at Queen Elizabeth's Grammar School, Blackburn
Sportspeople from Liverpool
Sportspeople from Bootle
1982 births
Living people